Elections for local government were held in England and Northern Ireland on 5 May 2005 along with the 2005 general election across the entire United Kingdom. In addition, the Isle of Wight held a local referendum on the issue of a directly elected mayor.

Despite losing the general election held on the same day, the Conservatives made some gains at Labour's expense, providing some comfort to the party. Conservative leader Michael Howard resigned soon afterwards and was succeeded by David Cameron, who had a decent platform to build on in his challenge to lead the Conservatives to a general election victory; the party had increased its share of council seats and importantly its share of seats in parliament.

Summary of results

Source: BBC local election results for England

Like in 2001, many results were in line with the general election on the same day.

The Liberal Democrats gained Cornwall, whilst simultaneously winning Camborne & Falmouth from Labour, and thus holding every parliamentary seat in Cornwall. Similarly in Somerset too, where they regained Taunton from the Conservatives.

The Conservative gain in Gloucestershire coincided with their gain of Forest of Dean from Labour, the swing towards them in Cheltenham where the previous Lib Dem MP had retired and their near-miss result where Labour narrowly held on to Stroud. Worcestershire's result coincided with reduced Labour majorities in Worcester and Redditch, whilst overtaking Labour for second place in Wyre Forest. The Isle of Wight was also in line with the general election, which saw a huge increase in the Conservative majority on the island.

Northamptonshire coincided with Labour's losses in Kettering, Wellingborough and Northampton South, all of which were extremely marginal seats that the Conservatives narrowly lost in 1997 and where they failed to make any progress in 2001. Shropshire similarly coincided with 3 gains in the general elections for the Conservatives, where they took The Wrekin and Shrewsbury & Atcham from Labour and took Ludlow from the Liberal Democrats. Suffolk coincided with no actual seat gains in the general election, but swings to the Conservatives of at least 3% in all seven constituencies. The swings were larger in their own five constituencies, with a swing of almost 7% in Bury St Edmunds.

The Liberal Democrat gain in Devon, however, happened despite a mixed bag of results in the general election. They lost Devon West & Torridge to the Conservatives, and in Torbay, the Conservatives reduced their majority. There were small swings to the Lib Dems in Totnes, Teignbridge and Devon North, though a big swing away from them in Tiverton and Honiton.

England

Non-metropolitan county councils
In 34 shire county county councils, all seats were up for re-election.

‡ New electoral division boundaries

Unitary authorities

Whole council
In two unitary authorities the whole council were up for election and one had a third of the council up for election.

‡ New ward boundaries

Third of council

Sui generis

Mayoral elections
Four direct mayoral elections were held.

Northern Ireland

All seats were up for election in the 26 districts of Northern Ireland. The many parties and the use of the single transferable vote meant that most councils ended up in no overall control.
The DUP gained majority control of three councils: Ards, Ballymena, and Castlereagh.

Results summary

Council Control

Source: ARK research and knowledge group

References

Local and Mayoral elections 2005. House of Commons Library Research Paper 05/93

 
2005
Local elections